is a 2016 Japanese horror comedy film directed by Kankurō Kudō. Tomoya Nagase played the lead role for the first time in 7 years. It was expected to be released on February 6, 2016, but was postponed because of a car accident scene that reminded people of a bus crash in Karuizawa. This film premiered at the 40th Hong Kong International Film Festival.

Cast
 Tomoya Nagase as Killer K
 Ryunosuke Kamiki as Daisuke
 Machiko Ono as Naomi Kamei
 Aoi Morikawa as Hiromi Tezuka
 Kenta Kiritani as Cozy
 Kanji Furutachi as Matsuura

References

External links

 

2016 films
2016 comedy films
2016 comedy horror films
Toho films
Films with screenplays by Kankurō Kudō
Japanese comedy horror films
2010s Japanese films